12 South African Infantry Battalion was a horse, dog and motorbike assisted infantry unit of the South African Army, which provided horse-mounted infantry and dog handlers to the army for defence purposes.

History

Origin
The SADF established a dog and equestrian centre at Voortrekkerhoogte in 1964.

Equestrian Centre History
By 1974, the Equestrian Centre was moved to the farm Welgegund near Potchefstroom.

A stud farm grew out of the equestrian centre in 1980. Budget cuts starting in 1989 eventually let to the closure of the De Aar facility in 1991.

The unit's equestrian capability was transferred to the police on April 14, 2005.

Equestrian Centre Insignia

Dog Centre History
The main function of the Dog Training School at Voortrekkerhoogte, was to train dogs and their handlers in mine detection reconnaissance, tactical and security work. The unit was also responsible for acquiring suitable dogs and researching dog diseases, nutrition and breeding
In the main, German Shepherds, Rottweilers, Doberman Pinschers, Labrador Retrievers, and Border Collies were trained. This training started when the dogs were almost two years old and lasted from one to two years.

The dog centre was moved to Bourke's Luck, in Mpumalanga, in 1979.

Dog Centre Insignia

Amalgamation into 12 SAI
By 1993 the Equestrian and Dog Centres were amalgamated into 12 SAI.

Commanding Officer and RSM

Col. Britz and RSM Schoeman were the first OC and RSM.

12 SAI insignia

Disbandment
By 2005, 12 SAI's dogs and related infrastructure was finally transferred to the South African Military Health Service, Military Veterinary Institute, while the units motorcycle and visual tracking capabilities were transferred to the Infantry School near Oudtshoorn.

Notes

Scientia Militaria vol 40, no 3, 2012, pp. 398–428. doi: 10.5787/40-3-1028 The South African Defence Force and Horse Mounted Infantry Operations, 1974-1985 Jacques J.P. de Vries, Sandra Swart

References

Infantry battalions of South Africa
Military units and formations of South Africa in the Border War
Military units and formations established in 1964
Military units and formations disestablished in 2005